The 1993 Giro d'Italia was the 76th edition of the Giro d'Italia, one of cycling's Grand Tours. The Giro began in Porto Azzurro, with a mountainous stage on 23 May, and Stage 10 occurred on 2 June with a stage to Senigallia. The race finished in Milan on 13 June.

Stage 1a
23 May 1993 — Porto Azzurro to Portoferraio,

Stage 1b
23 May 1993 — Portoferraio,  (ITT)

Stage 2
24 May 1993 — Grosseto to Rieti,

Stage 3
25 May 1993 — Rieti to Scanno,

Stage 4
26 May 1993 — Lago di Scanno to Marcianise,

Stage 5
27 May 1993 — Paestum to Terme Luigiane,

Stage 6
28 May 1993 — Villafranca Tirrena to Messina,

Stage 7
29 May 1993 — Capo d'Orlando to Agrigento,

Stage 8
30 May 1993 — Agrigento to Palermo,

Rest day
31 May 1993

Stage 9
1 June 1993 — Montelibretti to Fabriano,

Stage 10
2 June 1993 — Senigallia to Senigallia,  (ITT)

References

1993 Giro d'Italia
Giro d'Italia stages